Susuhunan, or in short version Sunan, is a title used by the monarchs of Mataram and then by the hereditary rulers of Surakarta, Indonesia.

Additionally in Bali and Yogyakarta, so-called "Kings of kings" reigned with this title, while their kingdoms were called "Sunanates".

The name Susuhunan is also used as a romantic nickname for loved ones, but also for highly respected public figures. Lovers or mistresses were also referred to with this nickname outside in private. The abbreviation Sunan is also used as a given name.

Names and titles
The full title of the Susuhunan in Javanese is: Sampeyan Dalem ingkang Sinuhun Kanjeng Susuhunan Prabhu Sri Paku Buwana Senapati ing Alaga Ngabdulrahman Sayidin Panatagama ("His Exalted Majesty, The Susuhunan, King Paku Buwana, Commander in the field of battle, Servant of the Most Gracious, the regulator of Religion"). This long title is occasionally abbreviated in media with Latin texts as SISKS, denoting Sampeyan dalem Ingkang Sinuhun Kanjeng Susuhunan, followed by the regnal name.

The rulers of Surakarta traditionally adopt the regnal name Pakubuwono (also spelled Pakubuwana ). Susuhunan is specific to the rulers of Surakarta; the rulers of Yogyakarta, who are also descended from the Mataram dynasty, have the title Sultan.

List of Susuhunans of Surakarta

The dates given are for the time ruling.

 Pakubuwono I, 1705–1719
 Pakubuwono II,  1727–1749 (Kartasura and Surakarta)
 Pakubuwono III, 1749–1788
 Pakubuwono IV, 1788–1820
 Pakubuwono V, 1820–1823
 Pakubuwono VI, 1823–1830
 Pakubuwono VII, 1830–1858
 Pakubuwono VIII, 1859–1861
 Pakubuwono IX, 1861–1893
 Pakubuwono X, 1893–1939
 Pakubuwono XI, 1939–1945
 Pakubuwono XII, 1945–2004
 Pakubuwono XIII, 2004–present
Note: For Pakubuwono XIII - from 2004 to 2012, there were two rival claimants to the throne, Hangabehi and Tedjowulan, both are sons of late Pakubuwono XII.

See also
Hamengkubuwono
Sunan
List of monarchs of Java

References

 Miksic, John N. (general ed.), et al. (2006)  Karaton Surakarta. A look into the court of Surakarta Hadiningrat, central Java (First published: By the will of His Serene Highness Paku Buwono XII. Surakarta: Yayasan Pawiyatan Kabudayan Karaton Surakarta, 2004)  Marshall Cavendish Editions  Singapore  

Susuhunan of Surakarta
Indonesian names
Indonesian families
Noble titles of Indonesia